Sam Latu (born 21 June 1988) is an Australian former professional rugby league footballer who played in the 2000s and 2010s.

Background
He was born as Sam Huihahau in Sydney, New South Wales, Australia.

Career
Latu played junior football with the Mascot Jets. His first-grade debut was for the South Sydney Rabbitohs against the Cronulla Sharks at ANZ Stadium in round 5 of the 2008 NRL season. He spent 2009 with the Canberra Raiders without making an appearance.

In 2010, Latu joined the Wests Tigers. He made his club debut near the end of the season, but injured his knee in the match, and failed to make another appearance that year. His next appearance was in round 6 of 2011, covering for injuries to Beau Ryan and Lote Tuqiri.

Midway through the 2011 season, Latu was released by the Wests Tigers to join Sydney Roosters feeder club, Newtown Jets

Latu was named in the Tonga training squad for the 2008 Rugby League World Cup.

References

1988 births
Australian sportspeople of Tongan descent
Australian rugby league players
Balmain Ryde-Eastwood Tigers players
Living people
Newtown Jets NSW Cup players
Rugby league fullbacks
Rugby league players from Sydney
Rugby league wingers
South Sydney Rabbitohs players
Tonga national rugby league team players
Wests Tigers players